Kula Puthra is a 1981 Indian Kannada-language film directed by T. R. Ramanna and produced by S. Venkataratnam. The film stars Shankar Nag and Gayatri whilst Dwarakish, Udaykumar and Leelavathi appeared in supporting roles along with Sowcar Janaki in a cameo role. The film was scripted by S. Bhavanarayana, photographed by S. Venkataratnam and had musical score by Satyam.

Cast
 Shankar Nag 
 Gayatri
 Dwarakish
 Udaykumar
 M. N. Lakshmi Devi
 Musuri Krishnamurthy
 Leelavathi
 Rajani
 Seetharam
 Sowcar Janaki in a guest appearance

Soundtrack
The music of the film was composed by Satyam with lyrics penned by Chi. Udaya Shankar.

Track list

References

1981 films
1980s Kannada-language films
Indian action films
Films scored by Satyam (composer)
Films directed by T. R. Ramanna
1981 action films